"Baby Blue" is a song written by Aaron Barker, and recorded by American country music artist George Strait.  It was released in April 1988 as the second single from his album If You Ain't Lovin' You Ain't Livin'.  It was a number-one hit in the United States, while it peaked at number 3 in Canada.

Content
Though it has never been confirmed, it has long been thought that Strait sang this song for his daughter, Jenifer, who died on June 25, 1986, at the age of 13, in an automobile accident in San Marcos, Texas.

Critical reception
Kevin John Coyne of Country Universe gave the song an A grade, calling it "another one of Strait’s smoothest pop performances, with just enough country touches in the production to keep his traditionalist credentials intact." Coyne states that "taken literally as a love gone wrong song, it’s a beautiful piece of work."

Charts

Weekly charts

Year-end charts

References

[ Allmusic]

1988 singles
1987 songs
George Strait songs
Song recordings produced by Jimmy Bowen
MCA Records singles
Songs written by Aaron Barker
Country ballads